Toribio Alfonso de Mogrovejo (16 November 1538 – 23 March 1606) was a Spanish prelate of the Catholic Church who served as the Archbishop of Lima from 1579 until his death. He first studied in the humanities and law before serving as a professor and later as the Grand Inquisitor at the behest of King Philip II. His piety and learning had reached the ears of the king who appointed him to that position which was considered unusual since he had no previous government or judicial experience. His noted work for the Inquisition earned him praise from the king who nominated him for the vacant Lima archdiocese. The pope confirmed this despite his protests.

Mogrovejo was ordained to the priesthood in 1578 and was later consecrated as an archbishop in 1580 before setting off for Peru to begin his mission. He was a noted and charismatic preacher who set about baptizing and catechizing the natives while confirming almost half a million people; these included Rose of Lima and Martin de Porres. The archbishop was a staunch advocate for archdiocesan reform and set to work reforming the diocesan priests from impurities and scandals while instituting new educational procedures for seminaries.

He predicted the exact date and hour of his death. His reputation for holiness and learning was never forgotten, and it led to calls for his canonization. Pope Innocent XI beatified the late archbishop and Pope Benedict XIII canonized him as a saint on 10 December 1726.

Life

Education
Toribio Alfonso de Mogrovejo was born on 16 November 1538 in the Valladolid province of Habsburg Spain, to the nobles Luis Alfonso de Mogrovejo (1510–1568) and Ana de Roblès i Morán (1515–???); his sister was Grimanese de Mogrovejo i Robledo (1545–1635). He was named after Turibius of Astorga.

He was noted as a pious child with a strong devotion to the Blessed Virgin. He fasted once a week in her honor and recited rosaries often. He received an education befitting a noble at the time; he entered the college at Valladolid in 1550 where he studied humanities.

He became a professor teaching law to students at the reputed college in Salamanca. His uncle Juan de Mogrovejo served as a professor there as well as at the San Salvador High School in Oviedo, before King Juan III invited him to teach at the college in Coimbra. Toribio accompanied his uncle there and studied at the college in Coimbra before returning to Salamanca sometime later. His uncle died not long after he returned to Salamanca for his studies. His learning and virtuous reputation led to King Philip II appointing him as the Grand Inquisitor on the Inquisition Court stationed at Granada in February 1571. He remained in that position until 1576 but not without impressing the king with his work.

Episcopate
During this time Philip II nominated him for the vacant Lima archbishopric, despite his strong protests. He used his knowledge of canon law to remind the king and the pope that priests alone could be designated with ecclesial dignities, but the pope overruled him. Preparations were made for him to be ordained before the formal announcement could be made. He was ordained to the priesthood in 1578 in Granada (after four consecutive weeks of receiving the minor orders) and Pope Gregory XIII named him on 16 May 1579 as the Archbishop of Lima; he received his episcopal consecration in August 1580 from the Archbishop of Seville Cristóbal Rojas Sandoval. In September 1580 he departed for Peru alongside his sister and her husband.

The new archbishop first arrived in Paita on 12 May 1581 which was 600 miles – or 970 kilometers – from Lima. He began his new mission travelling to Lima on foot while he baptized and taught the natives. He was enthroned in his new see a week later. His favorite topic was: "Time is not our own and we must give a strict account of it". He traversed his entire archdiocese three times on foot and alone, exposed to tempests and torrents as well as the wild beasts and tropical heat. He also had to deal with fevers, and often with threats from hostile tribes. He countered these, all the while baptizing and confirming almost one half million people, including Rose of Lima, Martin de Porres, Francis Solano (who later became a close friend), and Juan Masías, all of whom would be canonized.

He built roads and schoolhouses as well as chapels and hospitals, and established convents for them to live in. In 1591 he founded the first seminary in the Western Hemisphere and mandated that learning indigenous languages was a prerequisite in their formation. He inaugurated the first part of the third Lima Cathedral on 2 February 1604. He also assembled thirteen diocesan synods and three provincial councils during his tenure. He was seen as a champion of the rights of the natives against the Spanish masters. He learnt the local dialects and was seen as a champion for rights and liberties, in challenge to the Peruvian governors' power and control.

Mogrovejo sought the reformation of diocesan priests and found that some of their behavior had grown too scandalous to be continued. There were those priests who came to resent him for this, though Francisco de Toledo supported his reform efforts and rendered him assistance. At the request of Philip II he also oversaw the Third Provincial Council from 1582 to 1583. He served as the council's president, guiding rather than leading it; he drafted important conciliar documents. 

Mogrovejo also worked to implement the decrees from the Council of Trent and made evangelization a core theme in his episcopal career. He produced a trilingual catechism in Spanish/Quechuan/Aymara in 1584, implementing Trent's call for preaching in indigenous languages. He endorsed the council's decree which prescribed excommunication of clerics who engaged in business ventures, since these often exploited natives for work and profit. Pope Sixtus V in 1588 confirmed the acts of the Third Council of Lima which implemented Trent's decrees. Many dioceses in South America adopted these acts from Lima.

Mogrovejo held two more provincial councils in 1591 and in 1601. Mogrovejo made three pastoral visitations that were all extensive in time. He visited each parish and would first inspect all objects for divine worship (to be in good condition) before talking to the parish priest about the life of the parish. He would then check the parish registers and also see if the priest had the missal that Pope Pius V had mandated over a decade prior.

Death
He predicted the exact date and hour of his death. It was in Pacasmayo during a pastoral visit that he contracted a fever but continued labouring to the last and arrived at Zaña in a critical condition. He dragged himself to receive the Viaticum and died not long after this on 23 March 1606 (Holy Thursday) at 3:30 pm at the Saint Augustine convent. His final words were those of Jesus Christ on the Cross: "Lord, into Thy hands I commend my spirit". His remains are interred in the archdiocesan cathedral.

Sainthood
His beatification was celebrated under Pope Innocent XI in 1679 (ratified in the papal bull "Laudeamus"), and Pope Benedict XIII canonized him as a saint on 10 December 1726 through the papal bull "Quoniam Spiritus". His liturgical feast was once celebrated on 27 April but is now celebrated on 23 March. His cult was once confined for the most part to South America but is now more widespread because of his pioneering reforms. Pope John Paul II proclaimed him the patron saint for the Latin American episcopate in 1983.

See also

 List of Catholic saints
Mogrovejo
 Roman Catholic Archdiocese of Lima
 Saint Turibius of Mogrovejo, patron saint archive

References

External links
 
 Catholic Hierarchy 
 Lives of the Saints
 Catholic Online
 Short biography at MSN Encarta 
 American Catholic

1538 births
1606 deaths
16th-century Christian saints
16th-century Roman Catholic archbishops in Peru
17th-century Roman Catholic archbishops in Peru
16th-century venerated Christians
17th-century Christian saints
17th-century Spanish clergy
17th-century venerated Christians
Roman Catholic archbishops of Lima
Bishops appointed by Pope Gregory XIII
Colonial Peru
Spanish Roman Catholic bishops in South America
Spanish Roman Catholic saints
University of Coimbra alumni
University of Salamanca alumni
Academic staff of the University of Salamanca
University of Valladolid alumni
Venerated Catholics
16th-century Roman Catholic bishops in Peru
Canonizations by Pope Benedict XIII
Beatifications by Pope Innocent XI